Middle High German (MHG) is the term for the form of German spoken in the High Middle Ages. It is conventionally dated between 1050 and 1350, developing from Old High German and into Early New High German. High German is defined as those varieties of German which were affected by the Second Sound Shift; the Middle Low German and Middle Dutch languages spoken to the North and North West, which did not participate in this sound change, are not part of MHG.

While there is no standard MHG, the prestige of the Hohenstaufen court gave rise in the late 12th century to a supra-regional literary language based on Swabian, an Alemannic dialect. This historical interpretation is complicated by the tendency of modern editions of MHG texts to use normalised spellings based on this variety (usually called "Classical MHG"), which make the written language appear more consistent than it  actually is in the manuscripts. Scholars are uncertain as to whether the literary language reflected a supra-regional spoken language of the courts.

This process started in the 11th century, and all the East Central German dialects are a result of this expansion.

"Judeo-German", the precursor of the Yiddish language, is attested in the 12th–13th centuries, as a variety of Middle High German written in Hebrew characters.

Periodisation

The Middle High German period is generally dated from 1050 to 1350. An older view puts the boundary with (Early) New High German around 1500. 

There are several phonological criteria which separate MHG from the preceding Old High German period:
 the weakening of unstressed vowels to : OHG , MHG  ("days")
 the full development of Umlaut and its use to mark a number of morphological categories
 the devoicing of final stops: OHG  > MHG  ("day")

Culturally, the two periods are distinguished by the transition from a predominantly clerical written culture, in which the dominant language was Latin, to one centred on the courts of the great nobles, with German gradually expanding its range of use. The rise of the Hohenstaufen dynasty in Swabia makes the South West the dominant region in both political and cultural terms.

Demographically, the MHG period is characterised by a massive rise in population, terminated by the demographic catastrophe of the Black Death (1348). Along with the rise in population comes a territorial expansion eastwards, which saw German-speaking settlers colonise land previously under Slavic control.

Linguistically, the transition to Early New High German is marked by four vowel changes which together produce the phonemic system of modern German, though not all dialects participated equally in these changes:
 Diphthongisation of the long high vowels  > :  MHG  > NHG  ("skin")
 Monophthongisation of the high centering diphthongs  > : MHG  > NHG  ("hat") 
 lengthening of stressed short vowels in open syllables: MHG   > NHG   ("say")
 The loss of unstressed vowels in many circumstances: MHG  > NHG  ("lady")

The centres of culture in the ENHG period are no longer the courts but the towns.

Dialects

The dialect map of Germany by the end of the Middle High German period was much the same as that at the start of the 20th century, though the boundary with Low German was further south than it now is:

Central German (Mitteldeutsch)
West Central German (Westmitteldeutsch)
Central Franconian (Mittelfränkisch)
Ripuarian (Ripuarisch)
Moselle Franconian (Moselfränkisch)
Rhine Franconian (Rheinfränkisch)
Hessian (Hessisch)
East Central German (Ostmitteldeutsch)
Thuringian (Thüringisch)
Upper Saxon (Obersächsisch)
Silesian (Schlesisch)
High Prussian (Hochpreußisch)
Upper German (Oberdeutsch)
East Franconian (Ostfränkisch)
South Rhine Franconian (Süd(rhein)fränkisch)
Alemannic (Alemannisch)
North Alemannic (Nordalemannisch)
Swabian (Schwäbisch)
Low Alemannic (Niederalemannisch/Oberrheinisch)
High Alemannic/South Alemannic (Hochalemannisch/Südalemannisch) )
Bavarian (Bairisch)
Northern Bavarian (Nordbairisch)
Central Bavarian (Mittelbairisch)
Southern Bavarian (Südbairisch)

Writing system

Middle High German texts are written in the Latin alphabet. There was no standardised spelling, but modern editions generally standardise according to a set of conventions established by Karl Lachmann in the 19th century. There are several important features in this standardised orthography which are not characteristics of the original manuscripts:
the marking of vowel length is almost entirely absent from MHG manuscripts.
the marking of umlauted vowels is often absent or inconsistent in the manuscripts.

A particular problem is that many manuscripts are of much later date than the works they contain; as a result, they bear the signs of later scribes having modified the spellings, with greater or lesser consistency, in accord with conventions of their time. In addition, there is considerable regional variation in the spellings that appear in the original texts, which modern editions largely conceal.

Vowels

The standardised orthography of MHG editions uses the following vowel spellings:
 Short vowels:  and the umlauted vowels 
 Long vowels:  and the umlauted vowels 
 Diphthongs: ; and the umlauted diphthongs 

No such orthographic distinction is made in MHG manuscripts.

Consonants
The standardised orthography of MHG editions uses the following consonant spellings:
 Stops: 
 Affricates: 
 Fricatives: 
 Nasals: 
 Liquids: 
 Semivowels:

Phonology
The charts show the vowel and consonant systems of classical MHG. The spellings indicated are the standard spellings used in modern editions; there is much more variation in the manuscripts.

Vowels

Short and long Vowels

Notes:
 Not all dialects distinguish the three unrounded mid front vowels.
 It is probable that the short high and mid vowels are lower than their long equivalents, as in Modern German, but that is impossible to establish from the written sources.
 The  found in unstressed syllables may indicate  or schwa .

Diphthongs

Consonants

 Precise information about the articulation of consonants is impossible to establish and must have varied between dialects.
 In the plosive and fricative series, if there are two consonants in a cell, the first is fortis and the second lenis. The voicing of lenis consonants varied between dialects.
 There are long consonants, and the following double consonant spellings indicate not vowel length, as they do in Modern German orthography, but rather genuine double consonants: pp, bb, tt, dd, ck (for ), gg, ff, ss, zz, mm, nn, ll, rr.
 It is reasonable to assume that  has an allophone  after back vowels, as in Modern German.

Grammar

Pronouns 
Middle High German pronouns of the first person refer to the speaker; those of the second person refer to an addressed person; and those of the third person refer to a person or thing of which one speaks.
The pronouns of the third person may be used to replace nominal phrases. These have the same genders, numbers and cases as the original nominal phrase.

Personal pronouns

Possessive pronouns 
The possessive pronouns  are used like adjectives and hence take on adjective endings following the normal rules.

Articles
The inflected forms of the article depend on the number, the case and the gender of the corresponding noun. The definite article has the same plural forms for all three genders.

Definite article (strong)

Nouns
Middle High German nouns were declined according to four cases (nominative, genitive, dative, accusative), two numbers (singular and plural) and three genders (masculine, feminine and neuter), much like Modern High German, though there are several important differences.

Strong nouns

Weak nouns

Verbs

Verbs were conjugated according to three moods (indicative, subjunctive (conjunctive) and imperative), three persons, two numbers (singular and plural) and two tenses (present tense and preterite) There was a present participle, a past participle and a verbal noun that somewhat resembles the Latin gerund, but that only existed in the genitive and dative cases.

An important distinction is made between strong verbs (that exhibited ablaut) and weak verbs (that didn't).

Furthermore, there were also some irregular verbs.

Strong verbs

The present tense conjugation went as follows:

 Imperative: 2.sg.: , 2.pl.: 
 Present participle: 
 Infinitive: 
 Verbal noun: genitive: , dative: 

The bold vowels demonstrate umlaut; the vowels in brackets were dropped in rapid speech.

The preterite conjugation went as follows:

 Past participle:

Weak verbs

The present tense conjugation went as follows:

 Imperative: 2.sg: , 2.pl: 
 Present participle: 
 Infinitive: 
 Verbal noun: genitive: , dative: 

The vowels in brackets were dropped in rapid speech.

The preterite conjugation went as follows:

 Past participle:

Vocabulary

Sample texts

Iwein

The text is the opening of Hartmann von Aue's Iwein

Commentary: This text shows many typical features of Middle High German poetic language. Most Middle High German words survive into modern German in some form or other: this passage contains only one word ( 'say' 14) which has since disappeared from the language.  But many words have changed their meaning substantially.   (6) means 'state of mind' (cognates with mood), where modern German  means courage.    (3) can be translated with 'honour', but is quite a different concept of honour from modern German ; the medieval term focuses on reputation and the respect accorded to status in society.

Nibelungenlied

Middle High German
Uns ist in alten mæren    wunders vil geseit
von helden lobebæren,    von grôzer arebeit,
von freuden, hôchgezîten,    von weinen und von klagen,
von küener recken strîten    muget ir nu wunder hœren sagen.

Modern German translation
In alten Erzählungen wird uns viel Wunderbares berichtet
von ruhmreichen Helden, von hartem Streit,
von glücklichen Tagen und Festen, von Schmerz und Klage:
vom Kampf tapferer Recken: Davon könnt auch Ihr nun Wunderbares berichten hören.

English translation
In ancient tales many marvels are told us
of renowned heroes, of great hardship
of joys, festivities, of weeping and lamenting
of bold warriors' battles — now you may hear such marvels told!

Erec
The text is from the opening of Hartmann von Aue's Erec. The manuscript (the Ambraser Heldenbuch) dates from 1516, over three centuries after the composition of the poem.

Literature

The following are some of the main authors and works of MHG literature:

 Lyric poetry
 Minnesang
 Codex Manesse
 Reinmar von Hagenau
 Walther von der Vogelweide
 Heinrich Frauenlob
 Oswald von Wolkenstein
 Epic
 
 
 Chivalric romance
 Hartmann von Aue's  and 
 Wolfram von Eschenbach's 
 Gottfried von Strassburg's 
 Ulrich von Türheim's  and 
 Rudolf von Ems's works
 Konrad von Würzburg's works
 Eilhart von Oberge's 
 
 
 
 Chronicles
  
 Jans der Enikel's  and 
 
 Law

See also

 High German consonant shift
 Matthias Lexer

Notes

References

Sources

Further reading
 Jones, Howard; Jones, Martin H. (2019). The Oxford Guide to Middle High German, Oxford, UK: Oxford University Press. .
 Walshe, M.O'C. (1974). A Middle High German Reader: With Grammar, Notes and Glossary, Oxford, UK: Oxford University Press. .
 Wright, Joseph & Walshe, M.O'C. (1955). Middle High German Primer, 5th edn., Oxford, UK: Oxford University Press. The foregoing link is to a TIFF and PNG format. See also the Germanic Lexicon Project's edition, which is in HTML as well as the preceding formats.

External links

 Middle High German conceptual database
 Online versions of the two main MHG dictionaries
 Middle High German audio literature

History of the German language
High German languages
German dialects
High German, Middle
Languages attested from the 11th century